Dmitry Petrovich Zuyev ( – 4 September 1917) was an Imperial Russian Army general. 

He was commander of the 1st Infantry Division from 1907 to 1910. He fought in the Russo-Turkish War of 1877–1878 and the Eastern Front of World War I. He commanded the 25th (1910-1914) and the 29th Army Corps (1914-1915). In September 1915 he was appointed commander of the Dvinsk Military District.

After the February Revolution, he was removed from office and enlisted in the reserve of ranks at the headquarters of the Petrograd military district.
He died on 4 (17) September 1917 in Petrograd.

He was a recipient of the Order of St. Alexander Nevsky, the Order of the White Eagle, the Order of St. Vladimir, the Order of St. Anna and the Order of Saint Stanislaus.

Awards 

 Order of St. Anna, 4th Class, 1878; 3rd Class, 1884; 2nd Class, 1891; 1st Class, 1904
 Order of St. Stanislaus, 3rd Class with Swords and Bow, 1878; 2nd Class, 1887; 1st Class, 1900
 Order of St. Vladimir, 4th Class, 1893; 3rd Class, 1895; 2nd Class, 1907
 Order of the White Eagle, 6 December 1912
 Order of St. Alexander Nevsky, with Swords, 18 March 1915; and Diamond Badges, 1 May 1915

Bibliography

External links

 Zuev, Dmitry Petrovich Project "Russian Army in the Great War"
 Biography on the site "Russian Imperial Army"

Recipients of the Order of the White Eagle (Russia)
Recipients of the Order of St. Vladimir, 2nd class
Recipients of the Order of St. Anna, 1st class
Recipients of the Order of Saint Stanislaus (Russian), 1st class
Recipients of the Order of St. Anna, 4th class
People of World War I
1854 births
1917 deaths
Imperial Russian Army generals
Russian military personnel of World War I